The H[onourable] C[ompany's] S[hip] Intrepid was launched in 1780 by the Bombay Dockyard. She was a snow belonging to the British East India Company's naval arm, the Bombay Marine. She participated in the seizure of Malacca on 17 August 1795 and in an inconclusive single-ship action with a French privateer off Muscat on 22 November 1800. She foundered without a trace in late 1800 or early 1801.

Career
The Dutch government at Malacca arranged with the British government to turn Malacca over to the British rather than the having the Batavian Government, allies of the French, take possession. The British sent an expedition from Bengal that arrived off Malacca on 15 August 1795.  arrived on the 17th, and the operation began that morning. 
Intrepid was one of the British vessels that participated.

On 10 June 1797 Intrepid captured the Dutch settlement of Kupang, Timor, in cooperation with Resistance. Lieutenant Frost of Intrepid was sent ashore to become acting-governor of the settlement, but the native population rose up against him and he narrowly escaped, with sixteen sepoys and seamen being killed. Resistance then bombarded Kupang into submission and sent a strong landing party ashore, destroying much of the town before abandoning it.

On 22 November 1800 Intrepid, under the command of Captain George Hall, was returning to India from Bussorah and was off Muscat when she encountered a French privateer of twelve 6 and 9-pounder carronades. An engagement started at 9:30 am. The privateer, which had a larger complement than Intrepid, twice tried to board Intrepid, but Hall so maneuvered her as to frustrate the attempts. At about 10:45a.m. Hall sustained a mortal wound and was taken below decks. The First Lieutenant, Thomas Smee, continued the engagement until at about 11:45am the privateer sailed away. The British repaired Intrepids sails and rigging, and then gave chase, but were unable to catch the privateer. Hall died on the 30th. In all the British lost six men killed, including Hall, and 22 men wounded, including her two lieutenants, Smee and Best. Intrepid arrived back at Bombay on 10 December.

Fate
Later in October 1800  struck on the Perates, in the South China Sea some 300 miles to the southeast of Hong Kong, during a gale. She foundered with the loss of all her passengers and crew, who numbered some 150 persons.  was  sailing from China to Bombay when she sighted the wreckage. Houghton reported the loss at Bombay. 

In February 1802 reports had reached London that although the two vessels had made many discoveries relating to natural history and geography, and had seen wreckage of other vessels on uninhabited islands, they had found nothing further concerning Lord Eldon. 

The two vessels were still listed on the establishment of the Bombay Marine as of 1 January 1802. However, by 1803, there was a recognition that both Intrepid and Comet had disappeared without a trace. They were presumed to have foundered at sea.

See also
List of people who disappeared mysteriously at sea

Citations

References
 
 
  
 
 

1780 ships
1800s missing person cases
British ships built in India
Missing ships
People lost at sea
Ships of the British East India Company
Warships lost with all hands